Raymond Harry Peters (19 February 1918 – 15 July 1995) was Professor of Polymer and Fibre Science, University of Manchester, 1955-1984, then professor emeritus.

He was educated at Ilford County High School, King's College London and the University of Manchester.

He worked for Imperial Chemical Industries, 1941-6 and 1949-55.  After retirement, he was visiting Professor at UMIST, 1984-1986 and the University of Strathclyde, 1984.  He was president of the Society of Dyers and Colourists, 1967-1968.

References
 Who was Who

1918 births
1995 deaths
People educated at Ilford County High School
Imperial Chemical Industries people
British chemists
Alumni of King's College London